Vaišvila is a Lithuanian surname. Notable people with the surname include:

Rytis Vaišvila (born 1971), Lithuanian basketball player and coach
Zigmas Vaišvila (born 1956), Lithuanian politician

See also
Vaišvilas

Lithuanian-language surnames